Anthony Melville Rud (11 January 1893 – 30 November 1942) was an American writer and pulp magazine editor. Some of his works were published under the pen names Ray McGillivary and Anson Piper.

Biography 
Anthony Melville Rud was born in Chicago, Illinois,  to Dr. Anthony Rud (1867–1928), an immigrant from Kongsberg, Norway, and Dr. Alice Florence (Piper) Rud (1871-1941).
Rud attended St. John's Military School in Delafield, Wisconsin,  and graduated from Dartmouth College in 1914. He also studied at Rush Medical College in Chicago.

As an author, he worked in several genres, including science fiction, horror and detective. His notable works include science fiction/horror/detective story Ooze (1923), which appeared in the first issue of Weird Tales and also featured in the book collection The Moon Terror published by Weird Tales (anonymously edited by Farnsworth Wright). Rud authored a science fiction novel named The Stuffed Men (1934). Rud contributed stories to Weird Tales, Argosy, Thrilling Wonder Stories, Golden Fleece Historical Adventure and other magazines. 

He was the fourth editor of Adventure magazine from 15 October 1927 to 15 February 1930. 

Rud also edited Detective Story Magazine in 1938 for Street and Smith.

He died in New York City at age 49.

Bibliography

Selected short stories
The Devil's Heirloom (1922)
 Ooze (1923) 
The Stuffed Men (1934)
The Place of Hairy Death  (1934)

Novels
 The Last Grubstake (1922)
 The Second Generation (1923)
 The Devil's Heirloom (1924)
 The Sentence of the Six-Gun (1926)
 The Rose Bath Riddle (1934)
 House of the Damned (1934)
 The Stuffed Men (1935)
 Black Creek Buckaroo (1941)

Collections
 The Place of Hairy Death and Other Stories (2015)
 The Vengeance of the Wah Fu Tong (The Complete Cases of Jigger Masters, Volume 1) (2018)

References

External links 

 
 Anthony M. Rud, Ray McGillivray, Anson Piper bibliographies at Galactic Central
 

1893 births
1942 deaths
Writers from Chicago
Writers from New York City
American people of Norwegian descent
American people of Canadian descent
American science fiction writers
American horror writers
American detective fiction writers
Pulp fiction writers
American magazine editors
American male novelists
American male short story writers
20th-century American novelists
20th-century American short story writers
20th-century American male writers
Novelists from New York (state)
Novelists from Illinois
20th-century American non-fiction writers
American male non-fiction writers